A viral protein is both a component and a product of a virus. Viral proteins are grouped according to their functions, and groups of viral proteins include structural proteins, nonstructural proteins, regulatory proteins, and accessory proteins. Viruses are non-living and do not have the means to reproduce on their own, instead depending on their host cell's resources in order to reproduce. Thus, viruses do not code for many of their own viral proteins, and instead use the host cell's machinery to produce the viral proteins they require for replication.

Viral structural proteins 
Most viral structural proteins are components for the capsid and the envelope of the virus.

Capsid 

The genetic material of a virus is stored within a viral protein structure called the capsid. The capsid is a "shield" that protects the viral nucleic acids from getting degraded by host enzymes or other types of pesticides or pestilences. It also functions to attach the virion to its host, and enable the virion to penetrate the host cell membrane. Many copies of a single viral protein or a number of different viral proteins make up the capsid, and each of these viral proteins are coded for by one gene from the viral genome. The structure of the capsid allows the virus to use a small number of viral genes to make a large capsid.

Several protomers, oligomeric (viral) protein subunits, combine to form capsomeres, and capsomeres come together to form the capsid. Capsomeres can arrange into an icosahedral, helical, or complex capsid, but in many viruses, such as the herpes simplex virus, an icosahedral capsid is assembled. Three asymmetric and nonidentical viral protein units make up each of the twenty identical triangular faces in the icosahedral capsid.

Viral envelope 

The capsid of some viruses are enclosed in a membrane called the viral envelope. In most cases, the viral envelope is obtained by the capsid from the host cell's plasma membrane when a virus leaves its host cell through a process called budding. The viral envelope is made up of a lipid bilayer embedded with viral proteins, including viral glycoproteins. These viral glycoproteins bind to specific receptors and coreceptors on the membrane of host cells, and they allow viruses to attach onto their target host cells. Some of these glycoproteins include:
 Hemagglutinin, neuraminidase, and M2 protein in the influenza virus
 gp160, composed of subunits gp120 and gp41, in the human immunodeficiency virus (HIV). 
Viral glycoproteins play a critical role in virus-to-cell fusion. Virus-to-cell fusion is initiated when viral glycoproteins bind to cellular receptors.

Viral membrane fusion proteins 
The fusion of the viral envelope with the cellular membrane requires high energy to occur. Viral membrane fusion proteins act as catalysts to overcome this high energy barrier. Following viral glycoprotein binding to cellular receptors, viral membrane fusion proteins undergo a change in structure conformation. This change in conformation then facilitates the destabilization and fusion of the viral envelope with the cellular membrane by allowing fusion loops (FLs) or hydrophobic fusion peptides (FPs) on the viral envelope to interact with the cell membrane. Most viral membrane fusion proteins would end up in a hairpin-like conformation after fusion, in which FLs/FPs and the transmembrane domain are all on the same side of the protein.

Viral glycoproteins and their three-dimensional structures, before and after fusion, have allowed a wide range of structural conformations to be discovered. Viral membrane fusion proteins have been grouped into four different classes, and each class is identified by characteristic structural conformations:  
 Class I: Post-fusion conformation has a distinct central coiled-coil structure composed of signature trimer of α-helical hairpins. An example of a Class I viral fusion protein is the HIV glycoprotein, gp41.
 Class II: Protein lacks the central coiled-coil structure. Contains a characteristic elongated β- sheet ectodomain structure that refolds to give a trimer of hairpins. Examples of class II viral fusion proteins include the dengue virus E protein, and the west nile virus E protein. 
 Class III: Structural conformation is a combination of features from Class I and Class II viral membrane fusion proteins. An example of a Class III viral fusion protein is the rabies virus glycoprotein, G.
 Class IV: Class IV viral fusion proteins are fusion-associated small transmembrane (FAST) proteins. They do not form trimers of hairpins or hairpin structures themselves, and they are the smallest known viral fusion proteins. FAST proteins are coded for by members of the nonenveloped reoviridae family of viruses.

Viral nonstructural proteins 

Viral nonstructural proteins are proteins coded for by the genome of the virus and are expressed in infected cells. However, these proteins are not assembled in the virion. During the replication of viruses, some viral nonstructural proteins carry out important functions that affect the replication process itself. Similarly, during the assembly of viruses, some of these proteins also carry out important functions that affect the assembly process. Some of these viral nonstructural protein functions are replicon formation, immunomodulation, and transactivation of viral structural protein encoding genes.

Replicon formation 

Viral nonstructural proteins interact with host cell proteins to form the replicon, otherwise known as the replication complex. In the hepatitis C virus, viral nonstructural proteins interact with cellular vesicle membrane transport protein, hVAP-33, to assemble the replicon. Viral nonstructural 4b (NS4B) protein alters the host cell's membrane and starts the formation process of the replication complex. Other viral nonstructural proteins such as NS5A, NS5B, and NS3, are also recruited to the complex, and NS4B interacts with them and binds to viral RNA.

Immunomodulation 
The immune response of a host to an infected cell can be adjusted through the immunomodulatory properties of viral nonstructural proteins. Many species of large DNA viruses encode proteins which subvert host immune response, allowing proliferation of the virus. Such proteins hold potential in developing new bio-pharmaceutical treatments for inflammatory disease in humans, as the proteins have been proven to subvert inflammatory immune mediators. Viral nonstructural protein NS1 in the West Nile virus prevents complement activation through its binding to a complement control protein, factor H. As a result, complement recognition of infected cells is reduced, and infected cells remain unharmed by the host's immune system.

Viral regulatory and accessory proteins 
Viral regulatory and accessory proteins have many functions. These viral proteins control and influence viral gene expressions in the viral genome, including viral structural gene transcription rates. Viral regulatory and accessory proteins also influence and adjust cellular functions of the host cell, such as the regulation of genes, and apoptosis.

In DNA viruses and retroviruses, viral regulatory proteins can enhance viral gene transcription, likewise, these proteins can also enhance host cellular gene transcription too.

Viral accessory proteins, also known as auxiliary proteins, are coded for by the genome of retroviruses. Most viral accessory proteins only carry out their functions in specific types of cells. Also, they do not have much influence on the replication of the virus. However, in some instances, maintaining the replication of viruses would require the help (and function) of viral accessory proteins.

Endogenous retroviral proteins
Syncytin is an endogenous retrovirus protein that has been captured in the  mammalian genome to allow membrane fusion in placental morphogenesis.

References

External links 

 List of all known Viral Proteins in UniProtKB
 VirusMint

Virology